The Benson & Hedges International Open was a men's professional golf tournament which was played in England. It was founded in 1971 and for its first five years it was called the Benson & Hedges Festival of Golf. It was sponsored by Benson & Hedges, a cigarette company. It was part of the European Tour's annual schedule from the tour's first season in 1972 until the  tournament ceased in 2003, following the introduction of a ban on tobacco advertising and sponsorship of sporting events by the British government. The prize fund for the final edition of the tournament was €1,596,861, which was mid-range for a European Tour event at the time.

Winners

References

External links
Coverage on the European Tour's official site

Former European Tour events
Golf tournaments in England